Jan Strządała (born 4 February 1945 in Wiśla, Poland) is a Polish poet.

Biography 
Strządała studied at the Faculty of Medicine, University of Lodz (1961–1967). After the aborted literary studies, he started to work keeping up with gainful employment in various professions. He made his debut in 1969 with a book of lyrics  under the pseudonym John Strehl.

In 1970–1977 he worked in the Publishing Institute "PAX" in Warsaw. During martial he law led the Gliwice Literary Group, of which he was a founder. From 1985 to 1991 he was an employee of the Polish Academy of Sciences. In the years 1993–1996 he presided the Katowice Branch of the Polish Writers Association. In 1999–2002 he was vice president of Polish Writers Association in Warsaw. He is also the president of the Club of Creative Unions in Gliwice.

More than 70 independent publications (poems, essays) appeared in cultural magazines as well as in the Polish Radio and Television. Various texts have been set to music, among other things by Ewa Szydło. Strządała is an honorary member of the Polish-American Poets Academy, Inc. in Wallington. His poetry has been translated into Russian, German, Czech, English, Italian and Esperanto. He was a participant of the German-Polish poets steamer.

Books of poetry 
 , (pseud. Jan Strehl), Warszawa: PAX, 1969
 , Warszawa: Czytelnik, 1983, 
 , Warszawa: Czytelnik, 1988, 
 , Wyd. SPP, Katowice1993, 
 , Warszawa: Latona, 1994, 
 , Kraków: Baran & Suszczyński, 1997, 
 , Kraków: Baran & Suszczyński, 2001, 
 , Kraków: Miniatura, 2003, 
 , Kraków: Miniatura, 2004, 
 , Kraków: Miniatura, 2005, 
 , Kraków: Miniatura, 2007, 
 , Unibook, 2009
 , (pseud. Dawid Glen), Hsg. e-bookowo.pl 2010, 
 , (pseud. Dawid Glen), Wrocław 2010, wyd. II, 
 , Katowice: Hsg. Biblioteka Śląska, 2012, 
 , Katowice: Hsg. Biblioteka Śląska, 2012, 
 , Gliwice 2014, 
 , Gliwice: Arka, 2015,

Major awards  
 Award of the President of Gliwice in the field of culture for poetry in 1996, 2005 
 Cross of Merit, Warschau 2005
 "Medal for Merit to Culture – Gloria Artis", Warschau 2011
 "Literary Excellence Award", May 2013, Polish American Poets Academy, Wallington, USA, beim Wettbewerb Johannes Paul II.
 "Literary Excellence Award", September 2013, Polish American Poets Academy, Wallington, USA, Wettbewerb um das patriotische Gedicht

Bibliographies 
  – Hsg. Wiedza Powszechna Warszawa 1993

References

External links 
 Lyrics of Jan Strządała
 TV culture
 Lyrics
  Biography
 Polish Bibliography 1988 – 2001

Polish male writers
Polish poets
People from Katowice
Living people
1945 births
Recipients of the Gold Cross of Merit (Poland)
Recipients of the Bronze Medal for Merit to Culture – Gloria Artis